is a 1955 black-and-white Japanese film directed by Mitsuo Hirotsu.

Cast
 Ichikawa Raizō VIII
 Michiko Saga
 Tomosaburō Li
 Ryōsuke Kagawa
 Shinobu Araki
 Hiroshi Ueda
 Teruko Ōmi

References

Japanese black-and-white films
1955 films
Films directed by Mitsuo Hirotsu
Daiei Film films
1950s Japanese films